Fouras, also known as Fouras-les-Bains, is a commune in the French department of Charente-Maritime, administrative region of New Aquitaine (before 2015: Poitou-Charentes). It lies 34 km south of La Rochelle.

Geography
Fouras is on a peninsula. It is bordered by five beaches and a forest named "Bois Vert" ("Green Wood" in English) which covers 20% of its area.

There is a causeway linking Fouras to Fort Énet, which is walkable at low tide, in  the direction of Île-d'Aix. The pier for the island of Aix is also located in the territory of the commune.

The south coast of the peninsula of Fouras forms the northern side of the mouth of the river Charente. A little further south is the Île d'Oléron. Off the island between Aix and the Oleron Island is Fort Boyard, which was made famous by the French and U.K. TV game shows of the same name and whose character "Père Fouras" (also incorrectly pronounced ) increased the celebrity of the town.

Population

Vauban Fortress
The "Vauban Fortress" was initially a strategic fortification established by Philip the Fair, circa 1300. The donjon was rebuilt in 1480-1490 by Jehan II de Brosse. In 1689, Ferry reinforced the walls of the Donjon to set up a battery of 9 canons and a signaling point. In 1693 a lower circular battery was set up to control access to the river Charente. The donjon received a signal station from 1889 to World War II.

Gallery

People
Charles-Amable Lenoir

See also
 Communes of the Charente-Maritime department

International relations
 , Agia Paraskevi, Greece
 , Geroskipou, Cyprus

References

External links
 

Communes of Charente-Maritime
Aunis
Charente-Maritime communes articles needing translation from French Wikipedia